Lukšić is a Croatian surname. It may refer to:

Andrónico Luksic (1926–2005) Chilean businessman of Croatian origin and founder of the Luksic Group
Carl J. Luksic (1921–2009), American flying ace during World War II
Guillermo Luksic Craig (1956–2013), Chilean businessman, son and heir of Andrónico Luksic 
Igor Lukšić (1976), Montenegrin politician, Prime Minister of Montenegro 2010–2012
Igor Lukšič (born 1961), Slovenian political scientist and politician 
Kaštel Lukšić, a town within the administrative area of Kaštela in Dalmatia, Croatia
Oliver Luksic (born 1979), German politician

Another version of the same surname is Lussich:
Antonio Lussich (1848–1928), Uruguayan sailor, arboriculturist and writer
Lussich Arboretum, an artificial forest in Uruguay
Lussich Cove, a cove at the south Shetland Islands

Croatian surnames